Mistral Ridge is a mostly snow-covered ridge extending  in a north-northwest–south-southeast direction, located  east of Zonda Towers, Rymill Coast, Palmer Land, Antarctica. The ridge was photographed from the air by the U.S. Navy in 1966, and surveyed by the British Antarctic Survey in 1971–72. It was named by the UK Antarctic Place-Names Committee in 1977 after the mistral, the cold northwesterly wind of southern France. This is one of several features in the area named after winds.

See also
Pampero Pass
Spindrift Bluff

References 

Ridges of Palmer Land